L'Orignal is a Franco-Ontarian village and former municipality, now part of Champlain Township in eastern Ontario, Canada. Its population in 2016 was 1,450. L'Orignal likely took its name from its location on the Ottawa River once known as Pointe à l'Orignac (French for "Moose Point"), where moose crossed the river. It was one of the seigneuries of New France.

History
In 1674, the Company of New France granted the Seigneurie de L'Orignac (later renamed the Seigneurie de Longueuil) to François Prévost. It was one of the two seigneuries the King of France granted in present-day Ontario, along with La Salle's Seigneurie de Cataraqui (now Kingston).  As part of  New France, the area was ceded to Great Britain in 1763. The seigneurie was assigned to Upper Canada (Ontario) during the creation of Upper Canada and Lower Canada (Quebec) in 1791.

In 1798, Nathan Treadwell, of Plattsburgh, New York, purchased  of seigneurial land. The government confiscated the property during the War of 1812 and returned it to his son in 1823. In 1816, the Village of L'Orignal was chosen as the district town for the Ottawa District. The Ottawa District Courthouse, built in L'Orignal in 1825, is still in use. The decommissioned L'Orignal Jail is now a museum. L'Orignal Parish was established in 1836 as the first Catholic parish in Prescott County.

The Village was incorporated in 1876 and amalgamated into Champlain Township in 1997 as one of four wards.  It is now the county seat of Prescott and Russell United Counties.  As of the 2016 census, the population of the former Village of L'Orignal was 1,450.

Geography 
It is located at 45 degrees 37' N and 74 degrees 41' W.

External links
Official site

References
L'Original History

Former villages in Ontario
Communities in the United Counties of Prescott and Russell